Waltrams is a village located outside the town of Weitnau, in the Oberallgäu district of Bavaria, Germany.

Villages in Bavaria